Albany Park is one of 77 well-defined community areas of Chicago. Located on the Northwest Side of the City of Chicago with the North Branch of the Chicago River forming its east and north boundaries, it includes the ethnically diverse Albany Park neighborhood, with one of the highest percentages of foreign-born residents of any Chicago neighborhood.

Although the majority of those foreign-born residents are from Latin America, mostly from Mexico (especially from the state of Michoacán), Guatemala, and Ecuador, substantial numbers are from the Philippines, India, Korea, Cambodia, Somalia, Serbia, Croatia, Bosnia, Romania, Pakistan and the Middle East (especially Iraq, Iran, and Lebanon). Over 40 different languages are spoken in its public schools.

Due to the diverse population and immigrant population attraction, the population of the neighborhood increased by 16.5% during the 1990s.

History
The area was settled in 1893 when several investors purchased land in the area as areas closer to downtown became more heavily populated. DeLancy Louderback from Albany, New York was one of the investors and chose the name.

The developers added electric streetcars in 1896 and the Northwestern Elevated Railroad extended the Ravenswood branch to the Kimball terminal on December 14, 1907. This led to a building boom in the area. At this point in development, the north branch of the Chicago River meandered greatly, and therefore the Chicago Sanitary District straightened the river. This expanded and defined property lines and sewage in Albany Park.

By 1930, the population of the neighborhood reached 55,000, and many schools, religious institutions, and parks opened. Haugan Elementary School became the biggest elementary school in the city and Roosevelt High School's overcrowding led to Von Steuben Elementary being converted into a high school. Resident began moving to northern suburbs after World War II and the population declined quickly, leaving many stores uninhabited and properties empty. It wasn't until the 1970s, when a new immigration wave from Asia (mainly Korea) and Central America began to increase the population again. Today, Albany Park is the most diverse neighborhood in the city, and one of the most diverse in the entire country.

Neighborhoods
The traditional neighborhoods within the official community are (including rough boundaries):
 Albany Park: North: North Branch of the Chicago River (about 5100 N); South: Montrose Avenue (4400 N): East: North Branch of the River (about 3000 W); West: Pulaski Road (4000 W).
 Mayfair: Lawrence Avenue (4800 N), Montrose Avenue (4400 N), Pulaski Road (4000 W), and Cicero Avenue (4800 W).
 North Mayfair: Bryn Mawr Avenue (5600 N), Lawrence Avenue (4800 N), Pulaski Road (4000 W), and Cicero Avenue (4800 W).Immediately to the north, in North Park, lie Northeastern Illinois University, North Park University, and the Bohemian National Cemetery.

Korean commercial district

The neighborhood was once known as the "Koreatown" of Chicago, beginning in the 1980s. The majority of Korean shops in Albany Park were found on Lawrence Avenue (4800 North) between Kedzie Avenue (3200 West) and Pulaski Road (4000 West), and many are still there. This particular section of Lawrence Avenue has been officially nicknamed "Seoul Drive" by the city of Chicago because of the multitude of Korean-owned enterprises on the street. Although many of the Korean Americans in the neighborhood have been moving to the north suburbs in recent years, it still retains its Korean flavor. Every year there is a Korean festival, and the neighborhood is home to a Korean radio station (1330 AM) as well as two Korean-language newspapers. There are still many Korean businesses interspersed among the newer Mexican bakeries and Middle Eastern grocery stores. Approximately 45% of the businesses on this particular stretch of Lawrence Avenue are owned by Korean-Americans.

 Demographics 

After Jefferson Township was purchased and annexed by the city of Chicago and development began in the area that became Albany Park, immigrant German and Swedish farmers flocked to land. Many built their own homes. At the beginning of the 20th century, more upwardly mobile Russian Jews arrived in Albany Park to escape the crowded conditions of the very-heavily Jewish Near West Side/Maxwell Street area. This pattern continued as other residents in other Jewish-populated neighborhoods such as Lawndale and parts of West Town followed suit. These families began moving to northern suburbs such as Skokie after World War II. Starting in the 1970s, immigrants from Asia and Latin America, mainly Korea and Guatemala, began moving into the neighborhood's largely vacant properties and storefronts. Immigration continued from all around the world, and by the 1990s, there were large populations from the Philippines, Iran, Iraq, Lebanon, Poland, Vietnam, Burma, Cambodia, Mexico (largely from the state of Michoacán), Ecuador, and Colombia. Since the 1992-1995 war in Yugoslavia, roughly 1,200 Serbians who lived in Croatia resettled in Albany Park along with more than 4,000 Bosnians of all three backgrounds. Into the 2000s, the western part of the neighborhood became home to a substantial number of Indian and East African immigrants.

As of 2019, the community area has 49,806 residents. The racial makeup of the community area is 45% Hispanic/Latino, 32.2% White/non-Hispanic, 14.8% Asian/non-Hispanic, 4.9% Black/non-Hispanic, and 3% other.

Transportation
The Chicago Transit Authority's Brown Line terminates at Lawrence and Kimball Avenues.

CTA bus routes in Albany Park include: 53 Pulaski, 78 Montrose, 81 Lawrence, 82 Kimball-Homan, 92 Foster, and 93 California/Dodge.

Politics
Albany Park is divided between 3 wards; the 33rd, the 35th and the 39th. The wards are represented by Rossana Rodriguez-Sanchez in the 33rd ward, Carlos Ramirez-Rosa in the 35th ward and Samantha Nugent in the 39th ward.

It is similarly divided in the state legislature. In the Illinois Senate it is represented by John Cullerton, Iris Y. Martinez, Ira Silverstein and Heather Steans. In the Illinois House of Representatives it is represented by Jaime Andrade Jr., Ann Williams, John C. D'Amico and Greg Harris. On the Cook County Board of Commissioners, it is represented by Luis Arroyo Jr.

In 2016, Albany Park cast 10,590 votes for Hillary Clinton and 1,558 votes for Donald Trump. Four years earlier, Albany Park cast 9,304 votes for Barack Obama and 1,950 votes for Mitt Romney.

Schools
 Public Schools - Chicago Public Schools operates public schools

 Hibbard Elementary School
 Haugan Elementary School
 Budlong Elementary School
 Newton Bateman Elementary School
 North River Elementary
 Waters Elementary
 Volta Elementary
 Chappell Elementary
 ASPIRA at Haugan Middle School
 Haugan Middle Campus
 Albany Park Multicultural Academy
 Roosevelt High School
 Von Steuben Metropolitan Science Center
 Edison Regional Gifted Center
 Global Village
 John M. Palmer Elementary

 Private Schools
 North Shore Junior Academy
 Little Angels
 Telshe Yeshiva
 Gateway to Learning
 St. Matthias Transfiguration
 St. Edward School
 Eagle's Wings Urban Academy

 Universities
 Northeastern Illinois University
 North Park University

Parks and recreation facilities

 Buckeye Playlot Park
 Buffalo Playlot Park
 Eugene Field Park
 Jacob Playlot Park
 Jensen Park
 Kiwanis Park
 Ravenswood Manor Park
 River Park
 Ronan Park
 Sunken Gardens Playlot Park
 Vogle Playlot Park

Culture
The Chicago Shimpo'' previously had its offices in Albany Park. It is now headquartered in Arlington Heights.

Government agencies
Libraries
 Albany Park Branch: 3401 W. Foster Avenue
 Mayfair Branch: 4400 W. Lawrence Avenue

Police Department
 4650 N. Pulaski Road - 17th District

Fire Department
Engine Co. 110: 2322 West Foster Avenue
Engine Co. 124: 4426 North Kedzie Avenue
Engine Co. 69: 4017 North Tripp Avenue

Marine Corps
U.S. Marine Corps Reserve, 2nd Battalion 24th Marines: 3034-60 W. Foster Avenue

Community gardens
 Jensen Community Gardens
 Drake Community Garden
 Turtle Park Community Garden
 Global Gardens Community Garden
 Global Garden Refugee Training Farm

Active neighborhood organizations

 Albany Park Autonomous Center
 Carole Robertson Center for Learning (previously Albany Park Community Center.)
 Albany Park Chamber of Commerce
 Albany Park Neighbors
 Albany Park Theater Project
 American Indian Center
 American Legion
 Anthem Church
 Autonomous Tenants Union
 Cambodian Association of Illinois
 Christ Church
 Church of the Beloved Albany Park
 Communities United (formerly Albany Park Neighborhood Council)
 Foresight Design Initiative
 Friedman Place
 Full Gospel Chicago Church
 Hanul Family Alliance
 Healthy Albany Park Coalition
 Irish American Heritage Center
 King Oscar Lodge
 Korean American Community Services
 Latino Union Worker Center
 Lawrence Avenue Development Corporation
 Lawrence Hall Youth Services
 Mayfair Civic Organization
 Mexico-US Solidarity Network
 New Life Community Church
 North Branch Projects
 North Mayfair Improvement Association
 North Park Friendship Center
 North River Commission
 People of East Albany Park (PEAP) neighborhood organization
 Ravenswood Manor Improvement Association
 River Park Advisory Council
 Svithiod Independent Order
 Territory Albany Park
 True North Christian Fellowship
 Young Women's Empowerment Project
 West River Park Improvement Association
 West River Park Neighbors
 World Relief Chicago

Notable people
 Rod Blagojevich (born 1956), 40th Governor of Illinois (2003–2009). He resides on West Sunnyside Avenue in the community area and has done so, with the exception of his eight year incarceration, since 1999.
 Patti Blagojevich (born 1965), First Lady of Illinois (2003–2009). She resides on West Sunnyside Avenue in the community area and has done so since 1999.
 Neil Bluhm (born 1938), billionaire real estate and casino magnate. He was a childhood resident of Albany Park.
 Carl Giammares, singer and member of The Buckinghams resided at 4727 North Sacramento Avenue.
 Cecil Heftel (1924–2010), member of the United States House of Representatives from Hawaii's 1st congressional district (1977-1986). He was raised in Albany Park and attended Roosevelt High School.
 Randy Jackson (1926–2019), professional baseball player. He lived in Ravenswood Manor when playing for the Chicago Cubs.
 Alaric Jans (born 1949), film and theater composer. He is a past president of the Ravenswood Manor Improvement Association.
 Jerry Krause (1939–2017), general manager of the Chicago Bulls from 1985 until his retirement in 2003. He was raised in Albany Park.
 Sid Luckman (1916–1998), American football quarterback for the Chicago Bears. He was a resident of Ranvenswood Manor.
 Fred Pfeffer (1860–1932), professional baseball player. He was a resident of Ravenswood Manor at the time of his death.
 Elroy Sandquist Sr. (1899–1970), member of the Illinois House of Representatives from 1966 until his death in 1970. He resided at 2762 West Wilson Avenue during his legislative career.
 Elroy Sandquist Jr. (1922–1996), member of the Illinois House of Representatives from 1977 to 1983.
 Abe Saperstein (1902-1966), founder, coach and owner of the Harlem Globetrotters. He resided at 2948 West Eastwood Avenue.
 Bob Sirott (born 1949), broadcaster. As of September 2017, he is a midday radio host at WLS-AM.
 Sam Zell (born 1941), billionaire and founder and chairman of Equity International. He lived in Albany Park until his family moved to suburban Highland Park, Illinois when he was twelve.

See also

References

External links

 Albany Park Neighborhood Guide on ExploreChicago.org
 Official City of Chicago Albany Park Community Map
 Albany Park Living Map
 Healthy Albany Park
 Albany Park Community Center
 Albany Park Theater Project
 Albany Park Chamber of Commerce
 Albany Park Autonomous Center
 http://www.northmayfair.org
 Albany Park art, culture, housing, gentrification, immigration articles
 Albany Park Issues

 
Community areas of Chicago
Asian-American culture in Chicago
Koreatowns in the United States